Elborough may refer to:
                               
Elborough, Somerset, a village in England
Elborough Hill
Travis Elborough, a British author